The Norfolk and Western class J was a class of fourteen 4-8-4 "Northern" streamlined steam locomotives built by the Norfolk and Western Railway (N&W) at its Roanoke Shops in Roanoke, Virginia, from 1941 to 1950. They were operated in revenue service until the late 1950s.

These locomotives were built to pull the Powhatan Arrow, the Pocahontas, and the Cavalier passenger trains on the N&W main line between Norfolk, Virginia, and Cincinnati, Ohio; they also ferried the Southern Railway's Birmingham Special, Pelican, and Tennessean between Monroe, Virginia, and Bristol, Tennessee. The class Js, along with the class A and Y freight locomotives, formed the N&W's "Big Three": locomotives considered the pinnacles of steam technology.

Only one class J locomotive survives. No. 611 was retired in 1959 from revenue passenger service and moved to the Virginia Museum of Transportation (VMT) in 1962. It has been restored twice: once as part of the Norfolk Southern Railway's steam program in 1982, and again as part of the VMT's Fire up 611! campaign in 2015.

History

Design and construction

The Norfolk and Western Railway's (N&W) aging E class 4-6-2 "Pacifics" and K class 4-8-2 "Mountains" could not handle the rising passenger traffic at the outbreak of World War II, so the railroad sought a more powerful passenger steam locomotive. Its Mechanical Department originally considered a class N 4-8-4 type in the mid 1920s, but deemed its  driving wheels inadequate for the N&W's railway grades. N&W Tool Supervisor Franklin C. Noel proposed a streamlined design to give the locomotive smoothness and beauty along with speed, power, and dependability. After experimenting with four or five concepts, Noel developed the bullet-nosed design. His wife Louise suggested painting the Js black with a Tuscan red stripe wrapped with golden yellow linings and letterings.

The first 10 class J locomotives (Nos. 600–610) had 275 pounds per square inch (psi) boilers and Timken roller bearings on all axles, rods, pistons, crossheads, valve gear, and wrist pins. Calculated tractive effort was  – the most powerful 4-8-4 without a booster. To overcome the limitation, the wheelbase was made extremely rigid, lightweight rods were used, and the counterbalancing was precise – so precise that it could theoretically allow the locomotives to reach speeds up to  without the rail damage that could have occurred with conventional designs. One drawback of this highly engineered powertrain was sensitivity to substandard track.

Despite their comparatively small driving wheels, they rode very smoothly at all speeds: the Pennsylvania Railroad's inspector stated that it rode better than any of their own steam locomotives except for the 6-4-4-6 class S1. They also steam very well due to the large grate.

The first five locomotives (Nos. 600–604) were outshopped between October 1941 and January 1942, costing the railroad $167,000 apiece. The second batch of six locomotives (Nos. 605-610) was delivered in 1943 at a cost of $168,550 each without streamlined casings and lightweight side rods, due to the limitations on the use of certain materials during the war; classifying them as the J1s. When World War II ended in 1945, the N&W were allowed to reclassified the J1s as Js with the lightweight rods and streamlined shrouding added. The last batch of three locomotives (Nos. 611–613), rolled out in summer 1950, were marked as the last steam passenger locomotives built in the United States. In the mid 1950s, N&W engineers replaced the class J's duplex (two) coupling rods between the main (second) and third drivers (tandem rods) with a single coupling rod.

Revenue service
The class Js pulled the N&W's prominent passenger trains, such as the Powhatan Arrow, the Pocahontas, and the Cavalier between Norfolk, Virginia, and Cincinnati, Ohio, as well as ferrying Southern Railway's the Birmingham Special, the Pelican, and the Tennessean between Monroe, Virginia, and Bristol, Tennessee.

When N&W received a new president name Stuart T. Saunders in the late 1950s, they began purchasing first-generation diesel locomotives, experimenting with fuel and maintenance cost. They leased some EMD E6s, E7s, and E8s from the Atlantic Coast Line and Richmond, Fredericksburg and Potomac Railroads, before receiving their new fleet of EMD GP9s to replace their class Js from passenger service. The class Js were given doghouses on their tenders to accommodate the head-end brakemen when they were reassigned to freight service. They were retired and scrapped in 1958 and 1959, except for No. 611.

Accidents and incidents
 On June 12, 1946, No. 604 hauled the eastbound Powhatan Arrow after departing Cincinnati, Ohio, at 8:10 a.m. for Norfolk. At 3:18 p.m., the locomotive derailed four miles west of Powhatan, West Virginia, due to excessive speed at 56 mph, killing the engineer and fireman. These injuries included 23 passengers, three dining car employees, and one train service employee.
 On February 20, 1948, No. 607 derailed near Franklin Furnace, Ohio, while hauling the Powhatan Arrow, killing its fireman. The cause of the accident was failure to obey an automatic block-signal and entering a turnout at an excessive speed of 77 mph.
 On October 30, 1953, in Bristol, Virginia, No. 613 rear-ended a timed freight, injuring 56 people. The accident was blamed on the fast passenger train for failing to heed warning signals. The loco was repaired and remained in service until 1959.
 On January 23, 1956, No. 611 derailed along the Tug River near Cedar, Mingo County, West Virginia, while pulling the Pocahontas. The engineer ran the engine at an excessive speed around a curve and its high center of gravity caused it to flip on its side. The loco was repaired and continued revenue passenger service.
 On May 18, 1986, No. 611 was at the head of a Norfolk Southern employee appreciation train from Norfolk with Robert Claytor at the throttle. One of the passenger cars failed to negotiate a switch on the main line through the Great Dismal Swamp, causing it and 12 other cars of the 23-car train to derail. 177 of nearly 1,000 employees and their family members were injured; some of the more seriously injured had to be airlifted to hospitals in nearby Norfolk for treatment.

Preservation

One locomotive, No. 611, has been preserved. Its survival was in part due to its excellent condition after its 1956 derailment and subsequent repair, and also in part to the efforts of attorney and railfan W. Graham Claytor Jr., who offered to spare the locomotive from the scrap line. The No. 611 locomotive was donated to the Roanoke Transportation Museum in 1962, where it sat on static display for two decades. Since then, it has had two excursion careers: from 1982 to 1994, after Norfolk Southern Railway restored the locomotive, and from 2015 onwards by the VMT.

See also

Southern Pacific class GS-4
Norfolk and Western Railway class A

Notes

References

Bibliography

External links

Class J. No. 611 – Virginia Museum of Transportation

4-8-4 locomotives
J3
Passenger locomotives
Railway locomotives introduced in 1941
Roanoke, Virginia
Standard gauge locomotives of the United States
Steam locomotives of the United States
Streamlined steam locomotives
Preserved steam locomotives of Virginia